Paul Slane (born 19 June 1970) is an Irish former cyclist. He competed in two events at the 1992 Summer Olympics.

References

External links
 

1970 births
Living people
Irish male cyclists
Olympic cyclists of Ireland
Cyclists at the 1992 Summer Olympics
Place of birth missing (living people)